Alfred Edwin Monahan  (1877–1945) was the Anglican Bishop of Monmouth from 1940 until his death in 1945.

Biography
Monahan was educated at St Andrew's College, Dublin and Trinity College Dublin and ordained in 1905. He was Assistant Missioner at the  Wellington College Mission, Walworth and then Curate of St Swithun and Old St Martin, Worcester. He was then successively the Vicar (1912–1930),  Archdeacon ( 1930–1940) and finally Bishop of Monmouth (1940–1945). 
Manohan has been described as "a firm churchman of authoritarian personality who attracted and repelled according to taste, but he was a strong and effective teacher, preacher and spiritual director". The 1928 Prayer Book was the basis for his compilation The Churchpeople's Prayer Book. Bishop Monahan accepted the principle of reservation of the blessed sacrament in church and also permitted devotional services of Benediction., which his immediate successor would later forbid.

Despite his Anglo-Catholic churchmanship, however, Dr. Monahan's episcopate was notable for his deposing, in 1942, the extreme priest Edmund Loftus Macnachten, vicar of St Thomas, Overmonnow, who had adopted such Roman Catholic practices as processions of the Blessed Sacrament and who, according to records, had also absented himself from his parish without making provision for services to be taken. During Dr Monahan's time in the diocese many clergy who had trained at St Stephen's House, Oxford were recruited to the diocese, and for all the furore caused by the proceedings against MacNachten, the character of Monmouth became considerably more "High Church" under his leadership. Records which came to light after his death show that Monahan had wished to appoint the Warden of Pusey House, Oxford, Canon Frederic Hood, as Dean of Monmouth, but was prevented from doing so by the refusal of the then Dean to retire.

Bishop Monahan died in post on 10 August 1945.

References

1877 births
1945 deaths
Christian clergy from Dublin (city)
People educated at St Andrew's College, Dublin
Alumni of Trinity College Dublin
Bishops of Monmouth
20th-century bishops of the Church in Wales
Anglo-Catholic bishops
Archdeacons of Monmouth
Welsh Anglo-Catholics
19th-century Anglican theologians
20th-century Anglican theologians